Gergana Slavcheva (Bulgarian: Гергана Славчева), married Simeonov (Bulgarian: Симеонов)  (born October 20, 1979) is a former Bulgarian female basketball player.

External links
Profile at eurobasket.com

1979 births
Living people
Bulgarian women's basketball players
FIU Panthers women's basketball players
Los Angeles Sparks draft picks
Phoenix Mercury players
Small forwards
Basketball players from Sofia
Bulgarian expatriate basketball people in the United States
Bulgarian expatriate basketball people in Italy
Bulgarian expatriate basketball people in France